The Nio ET7 is a battery-powered executive sedan produced by Chinese electric car company Nio. The ET7 is currently serving as the flagship model.

Overview

The Nio ET7 was unveiled in China on 9 January 2021 at the 'Nio Day' event in Chengdu, retaining many design cues of the 2019 Nio ET Preview concept car. It was on sale on March 28th in 2022 in China with a starting price of ¥448.000 (~$69,200 USD). It acts as a direct competitor to the Tesla Model S sedan in China. It has been announced by Nio that ET7 will be sold in Germany later in 2022.  On the 26th April 2022, Nio's 200,000th car was produced and it was an ET7.

The interior of the ET7 features NOMI AI assistant on the dashboard, an 10.2”  electronic instrument cluster, a 12.8” center touchscreen, and a 23-speaker audio system with a 1000-watt output. ET7 comes with third-generation Qualcomm® Snapdragon™ Automotive Cockpit Platform for in-car mobile connectivity and communication including 5G, NFC and Bluetooth 5.2. ET7 will be first production car to feature Karuun®, a sustainable rattan material. ET7 also features, NOMI AI personal assistant, 256 colours of interior ambient lighting,  soft close doors, and intelligent fragrance system.

Specifications 
The Nio ET7 comes available with three battery options: a 70-75 kWh battery (NEDC range of ), a 100 kWh battery (NEDC range of ), and eventually a 150 kWh Ultra High Range semi solid-state battery (NEDC range of ), which has an energy density of 360Wh/kg.

Autonomous driving system 
The autonomous driving system in the Nio ET7 is called Aquila, which uses 33 sensors, including seven 8 MP high-definition cameras, four 3 MP light-sensitive surround-view cameras, a high-resolution LIDAR with a  range, 5 millimeter-wave radars, 12 ultrasonic radars, and 2 high-precision positioning units. The Aquila autonomous driving system generates 8 gigabytes of data per second which is analysed by an onboard computer called Adam.

Aerodynamics 
The aerodynamics of the Nio ET7 was one of the primary focus areas during the development of the vehicle. Extreme work and effort was dedicated to making sure that the car achieved an extremely low aerodynamics drag coefficient in order to enhance the vehicle's driving range and performance. On September 20th 2021 the Nio ET7 was tested at CAERI  Wind tunnel Testing Centre in Chongqing, China and achieved a certified drag coefficient of 0.208.

Nio ET Preview 
The Nio ET Preview concept electric sedan was revealed at Auto Shanghai in April 2019. It previews Nio's ET series of sedans, and more specifically, the production ET7. The ET7 retains many of the design cues and overall shape featured in the concept.

References

External links

Official website

ET7
2020s cars
Cars of China
Production electric cars
Cars introduced in 2021
Sports sedans
Euro NCAP executive cars